Chu Mu-yen (born 14 March 1982) is a Taiwanese Taekwondo athlete from Taiwan.  He is the second Taiwanese athlete and first male to win a gold medal at the Olympics, winning in men's under 58-kilogram class in Taekwondo at the Athens 2004 Games. In the 2008 Olympics, Chu won the bronze medal in the men's under 58-kilogram class in Taekwondo.
He also won the gold medal in the 2003 World Taekwondo Championships.

References

External links

NBC Olympics Profile

1982 births
Living people
Taiwanese people of Hakka descent
Olympic taekwondo practitioners of Taiwan
Taekwondo practitioners at the 2004 Summer Olympics
Taekwondo practitioners at the 2008 Summer Olympics
Olympic gold medalists for Taiwan
Olympic bronze medalists for Taiwan
Hakka sportspeople
Sportspeople from Taoyuan City
Asian Games medalists in taekwondo
Olympic medalists in taekwondo
Taekwondo practitioners at the 2002 Asian Games
Taekwondo practitioners at the 2006 Asian Games
Medalists at the 2008 Summer Olympics
Medalists at the 2004 Summer Olympics
Asian Games silver medalists for Chinese Taipei
Asian Games bronze medalists for Chinese Taipei
Medalists at the 2002 Asian Games
Medalists at the 2006 Asian Games
Universiade medalists in taekwondo
Universiade gold medalists for Chinese Taipei
Medalists at the 2003 Summer Universiade